The United States Navy enlisted warfare designations represent the achievement of a qualification and entitles the member to wear the associated insignia. When awarded in accordance with appropriate guidelines, enlisted sailors are authorized to place the designator in parentheses immediately after the member’s rate abbreviation, for example, MM1(SW) Smith, HM2(CAC) Jones.  In cases of multiple designators, the designators are separated by a slash enclosed in parentheses, for example, MM1(SW/AW) Smith, HM2(FMF/CAC) Jones.  Although commissioned officers have warfare pins and designations, such as Surface Warfare Officer, they do not use warfare designators in their titles.

Aviation community 
 (AW) - Aviation Warfare Specialist
 (CAC) - Marine Combat Aircrew
 (NAWS) - Naval Aircrew Warfare Specialist

Surface Warfare community 
 (SW) - Surface Warfare Specialist

Undersea Warfare community 
 (SS) - Submarine Warfare Specialist (or "Qualified Submarine Specialist")
 (SU) - "In training for submarine qualifications"
 (SQ) - "Qualified in submarines, but not planned for future assignment to submarine duty."
 (SG) - "Qualified in submarines, but not in submarine source rating; not detailed by the submarine community." 
 (SP) - "Previously assigned in submarines; assigned only to those personnel disqualified for submarine duty and serving in a submarine support billet; detailed by the submarine community, but not to be reassigned to submarine duty without prior approval of NAVPERSCOM."
 (IUSS) - Integrated Undersea Surveillance System Specialist
 (DSI) - Deep Submergence Insignia

Marine Corps support community 
 (CAC) - Marine Combat Aircrew
 (FMF) - Fleet Marine Force Warfare Specialist

Parachutist community 
 (PJ) - Basic Parachutist or Navy and Marine Corps Parachutist
 (FPJ) - Free Fall Parachutist

Special Operations community 

 (DV) - Diver - applies to personnel with Navy Enlisted Classifications: 
 5311 - Saturation Diver
 5342/5931 - Diver First Class 
 5343/5932 - Diver Second Class
 5345 - SCUBA Diver
  
 HM-8493 - Medical Deep Sea Diving Technician
 HM-8494 - Deep Sea Diving Independent Duty Corpsman
 (MCD) - Marine Combatant Diver - applies to personnel with Navy Enlisted Classifications:
 HM-8403 - Fleet Marine Force Reconnaissance Independent Duty Corpsman 
 HM-8427 - Fleet Marine Force Reconnaissance Corpsman
 (MDV) - Master Diver - applies to personnel with Navy Enlisted Classifications:
 5341/5933 - Master Diver 
 5346 - Master Saturation Diver
 (DSW) - Diving Salvage Warfare Specialist
 (EWS) - Explosive Ordnance Disposal Warfare Specialist 
 (EOD) - no longer used; see (EWS)

Special Warfare community 

 (SEAL) - Naval Special Warfare Specialist; a designator for Special Warfare Operator (SO) rating
 (SWCC) - Special Warfare Combatant-craft Crewmen; a designator for Special Warfare Boat Operator (SB) rating

Expeditionary Warfare community 
 (EXW) - Expeditionary Warfare Specialist

Construction community 

 (SCW) - Seabee Combat Warfare Specialist
 (EXW) - Expeditionary Warfare Specialist

Information Warfare community 

 (IW) - Information Warfare Specialist
IDW was updated to IW in July 2016.

See also
United States Navy enlisted rate insignia
List of United States Navy ratings
Uniforms of the United States Navy
Badges of the United States Navy
List of Naval Officer Designators
United States Navy officer rank insignia
List of United States Navy staff corps (insignia)
Navy Enlisted Classification

References

External links 
 MILPERSMAN
 Erdal Can Alkoçlar

United States Navy lists